Sir Peter Hyla Gawne Stallard  (6 March 1915 – 25 October 1995) was Lieutenant Governor of the Isle of Man from 1967 to 1972.

Career
Educated at Bromsgrove School and Corpus Christi College, Oxford, Stallard joined the colonial service in Nigeria in 1937. He served in West Africa and Burma during World War II being given an emergency commission in 1941 and reaching the rank of Lieutenant-Colonel by the end of the War. He later re-joined the colonial service, becoming Secretary to the Prime Minister of the Federation of Nigeria in 1957 in the run-up to independence before moving on to be Governor of British Honduras in 1961, where he arrived in the aftermath of serious hurricane damage. He retired in 1966.

In retirement he became Lieutenant Governor of the Isle of Man: in August 1973 the Summerland disaster took place. and he had to contend with calls for independence from Manx people. He later chaired an inquiry into military training on Dartmoor.

Family
In 1941 he married Mary Elizabeth Kirke; they had one son and one daughter.

References

|-
 

1915 births
1995 deaths
Manx politicians
People educated at Bromsgrove School
Knights Commander of the Order of St Michael and St George
Commanders of the Royal Victorian Order
Commanders of the Order of the British Empire
Alumni of Corpus Christi College, Oxford
Governors of British Honduras
Lieutenant Governors of the Isle of Man